The Songimvelo-Malolotja Transfrontier Censervation Area is a peace park located on the South Africa - Eswatini border between Barberton (South Africa) and Pigg's Peak (Eswatini) and covers an area of approximately , with potential extensions of another  .

The core of the park is to be the    Songimvelo Game Reserve in South Africa and the  Malolotja Nature Reserve in Eswatini. These parks share a common border.
On the Eswatini side are three protection-worthy areas, namely the Bulembu National Landscape, Makhonjwa National Landscape, and the Sondeza National Landscape.

The long-term plan is that this Transfrontier Conservation Area is to be incorporated as part of the Greater Lubombo Transfrontier Conservation Area.

References
Peace Parks : http://www.peaceparks.org/Parks_1022100000_0_0_0_0_6_Lubombo+TFCA+Lubombo.htm

Protected areas of Eswatini
Protected areas of South Africa